Aaron Tredway (born February 27, 1976) is the lead pastor of Fellowship City Church and vice president of Ambassadors Football International.

Early Life and Education 
Tredway was born on February 27, 1976. He’s a graduate of Liberty University and California State University, Stanislaus, and holds two degrees in physical education and two degrees in theology, including a doctorate of ministry.

Career 
In 2006, Aaron was the founder and executive director of the Cleveland City Stars, a professional soccer team based in Cleveland, Ohio. 

After a twenty-year professional soccer career as a player, coach, and executive, Aaron now serves as the lead pastor of Fellowship City Church, a growing multisite church in Cleveland, Ohio. 

Aaron is a sought-after speaker and consultant on the subject of leadership and has presented to several Fortune 500 companies. He also continues to mentor dozens of professional athletes around the world.

Aaron published his first book, To Who: A Competition for Glory, in conjunction with the 2010 FIFA World Cup in South Africa. To Who has sold over one hundred thousand copies to date and has been published on three continents.

In 2016, Aaron released his second book, Outrageous: Awake to the Unexpected Adventures of Everyday Faith, which highlights Aaron’s belief that we all have an opportunity to wake up to a life far more exciting than we imagine. In his words, "He would much rather spend his time and energy traveling to the world’s most remote, underserved areas with a soccer ball than lead a safe life without purpose."

In his latest book, Don’t Miss Your Life: The Secret to Significance, Aaron shares his personal discovery of the secret to significance and invites you to live the life God created for you—a life pursuing significance rather than success.

Personal Life 
He and his wife, Ginny, reside in Cleveland, Ohio, with their son, Noah.

Authored Books 

 To Who: A Competition for Glory. Aaron Tredway, 2014
 Outrageous: Awake to the Unexpected Adventures of Everyday Faith. Baker Books, 2016

 Don’t Miss Your Life: The Secret to Significance. BroadStreet Publishing, 2022

Media Appearances 

 Hour of Power with Bobby Schuller (January 29, 2023): https://hourofpower.org/episode/power-in-power-out/#podcastThe Power Hour with Pat Williams (November 22, 2022): https://omny.fm/shows/pat-williams-power-hour/aaron-tredway-and-jerry-boykin
 His Story, His Glory with Taylor Dooley (Season 2, Ep.23) (November 23, 2022): https://subspla.sh/qxn8yc7
 Ken and Deb in the Morning with Ken Brooks and Deb Gustafson / Moody Radio (January 9, 2023): https://omny.fm/shows/ken-and-deb-mornings/don-t-miss-your-life-a-conversation-with-aaron-tre
 The Influencers Podcast (January 10, 2023 – Episode 116) https://cityserve.us/2023/01/23/why-we-must-know-the-difference-between-success-and-true-significance/
 Hour of Power with Bobby Schuller (January 29, 2023): https://hourofpower.org/episode/power-in-power-out/#podcast
 Life Today Live with Randy Robison (February 2, 2023): https://podcasts.apple.com/us/podcast/success-is-overrated-aaron-tredway-on-life-today-live/id1501108061?i=1000597794032

External Links 

 Official Website
 Fellowship City Church

References 

1976 births
Living people
Place of birth missing (living people)
American soccer chairmen and investors
American soccer players
California State University, Stanislaus alumni
Association footballers not categorized by position